The 2018–19 USC Trojans men's basketball team represented the University of Southern California during the 2018–19 NCAA Division I men's basketball season. Led by sixth-year head coach Andy Enfield, they played their home games at the Galen Center in Los Angeles, California as members of the Pac-12 Conference.

Previous season
The Trojans finished the season 24–12, 12–6 in Pac-12 play to finish in second place. As the No. 2 seed in the Pac-12 tournament, they defeated Oregon State in the quarterfinals and Oregon in the semifinals before losing to Arizona in the championship game. They were one of the last four teams not selected for the NCAA tournament and as a result earned a No. 1 seed in the National Invitation Tournament, where they defeated UNC Asheville in the first round before losing to Western Kentucky in the second round.

Offseason

Departures

2018 recruiting class

Roster

Sophomore Forward Jordan Usher transferred to Georgia Tech on December 31, 2018 after being suspended indefinitely for "unspecified conduct issues."

Schedule and results

|-
!colspan=9 style=| Non-conference regular season

|-
!colspan=9 style=|  Pac-12 regular season

|-
!colspan=9 style=| Pac-12 tournament

References

USC Trojans men's basketball seasons
Usc
USC Trojans basketball, men
USC Trojans basketball, men
USC Trojans basketball, men
USC Trojans basketball, men